The 1989–90 Purdue Boilermakers men's basketball team represented Purdue University during the 1989–90 college basketball season. Led by head coach Gene Keady, the team finished second in the Big Ten regular season standings. The Boilermakers earned the #2 seed in the Midwest Region of the NCAA tournament, but were upset in the second round by Texas, finishing the season with a 22–8 record (13-5 Big Ten).

Roster

Schedule and results

|-
!colspan=6 style=| Regular Season

|-
!colspan=6 style=| NCAA Tournament

Rankings

Awards and honors
Steve Scheffler – Big Ten Player of the Year
Gene Keady – Big Ten Coach of the Year

Team players drafted into the NBA

References

Purdue Boilermarkers
Purdue
Purdue Boilermakers men's basketball seasons